Somebody's Daughter may refer to:
 Somebody's Daughter (film), a 1992 television film
 Somebody's Daughter (album), a 1998 album by Gina Jeffreys
 "Somebody's Daughter" (song), a 2018 song by Tenille Townes